Biljana Filipović-Bandelier (born 12 January 1986) is a retired Serbian handball player who was a member of the Serbian national team.

References

1986 births
Living people
Serbian female handball players
Serbian expatriate sportspeople in Hungary
Expatriate handball players